2001 S.League was the sixth season of Singapore's professional football league. It was won by Geylang United, which was their second league title.

League table

Foreign players
Each club is allowed to have up to a maximum of 4 foreign players.

Top scorers

Source:

References

Singapore Premier League seasons
1
Sing
Sing